Jianchang is a county of Huludao City in the southwest of Liaoning province, China. The Weizhangzi–Tashan railway also passes through the County.

Near the border with Hebei province lies the Jianchang Longtan Grand Canyon, home to wide variety of plants and animals. In 2009 a Troodontid dinosaur fossil with feathers was discovered in Jianchang.  It is the earliest known such fossil and provides evidence for the link between dinosaurs and birds. Also found here, in Jiufotang Formation rocks, was the early modern bird Schizooura.

Administrative divisions
There are seven towns, 21 townships, and one ethnic township in the county.

Towns:
Jianchang
Bajiazi
Lamadong
Yaowangmiao
Tangshenmiao
Linglongta
Datun

Townships:

Climate

References

External links
 Jianchang Longtan Grand Canyon

County-level divisions of Liaoning
Huludao